The American River is a tributary of the Bumping River in Washington. It flows down the east side of the Cascade Range, through Wenatchee National Forest and the William O. Douglas Wilderness.

The American River part of the Columbia River basin, via the Bumping, Naches, and Yakima rivers.

From its source at American Lake, it flows north for several miles, picking up its tributary the Rainier Fork American River, which flows east down from the vicinity of Chinook Pass. State Route 410 crossing Chinook Pass from Mount Rainier National Park, then follows the Rainier Fork and the American River valleys.

After its confluence with Rainier Fork, the American River flows through Pleasant Valley. It joins the Bumping River within the American Forks Campground.

An early name for the American River was Miners Creek. According to historian Gretta Gossett, the river was renamed for the American River in California, "by hopeful miners".

See also
 List of rivers of Washington
 List of tributaries of the Columbia River

References

External links

 , USGS, GNIS

Rivers of Washington (state)
Rivers of Yakima County, Washington
Tributaries of the Yakima River